Foreign Trade University (FTU) is a public university established in 1960, located in Hanoi, Vietnam with satellite campuses in Ho Chi Minh City and Quảng Ninh. 

FTU is regarded as one of the most prestigious universities in Vietnam, offering a wide range of business courses - from economics, business administration, and finance to economic law and business languages. The annual admission to FTU is the most competitive in Vietnam and applicants are required to have very high test scores. The core major of the university is International Business Economics, which attracts the most elite students in the country.    Students who graduated from FTU are recognized as being active and well-qualified.

FTU offers both undergraduate and graduate programs for both local and foreign students. These courses are taught in Vietnamese, English, Japanese, Chinese and French.

President Board
source: 
 President: Assoc.Prof.Dr Bui Anh Tuan
 Chairman of University Council: Assoc.Prof.Dr Le Thi Thu Thuy
 Vice President: Assoc.Prof.Dr Pham Thu Huong
 Vice President: Assoc.Prof.Dr Dao Ngoc Tien

Academic faculties and departments 
 School of Economics and International Business
 Faculty of International Economics
 Faculty of Law
 Faculty of Business Administration
 Faculty of Banking & Finance
 Faculty of Business English
 Faculty of Japanese Language
 Faculty of Chinese Language
 Faculty of French Language
 Faculty of English for Specific Purposes
 Faculty of Political Sciences
 Faculty of Basic Science
 Department of Vietnamese Language
 Department of Russian Language

Courses and programs

Degree programs

Bachelor programs 
 Bachelor of International Business Economics (Advanced Program, taught in English, with Colorado State University, USA)
 Bachelor of International Business Economics (High Quality program, taught in English)
 Bachelor of International Business Economics
 Bachelor of International Trade
 Bachelor of International Business
 Bachelor of International Business Management (Advanced Program, taught in English, with California State University, USA)
 Bachelor of International Business Management (High Quality program, taught in English)
 Bachelor of International Business Management
 Bachelor of Accounting
 Bachelor of Banking and International Finance (High Quality program, taught in English)
 Bachelor of International Finance
 Bachelor of Financial Analysis and Investment Management
 Bachelor of Banking
 Bachelor of International Economics (High Quality program, taught in English)
 Bachelor of International Economics
 Bachelor of Economics (French Program, with University of Nice Sophia Antipolis, France)
 Bachelor of International Business Law (LLB)
 Bachelor of International Trade Law (LLB)
 Bachelor of Business English
 Bachelor of Business Japanese
 Bachelor of Business Chinese
 Bachelor of Business French
 Bachelor of Business Studies (English Program, with University of Bedfordshire, UK)
 Bachelor of Financial Management & Services (English Program, with Niels Brock Copenhagen Business College, Denmark)
 Bachelor's degree in International Finance Services/Finance/Economics (English Program, with London Metropolitan University, UK)

Master programs 
 Master of International Economics
 Master of Business Administration
 Master of International Business
 Master of Banking and Finance
 Master of International Business (English Program, with La Trobe University, Australia)
 Master of International Trade Law and Policy (English Program, with World Trade Institute, Switzerland)
 Master of Europe-Asia Economic Relations (French Program, with University of Rennes, France)
 Master of Project for Innovation and Enterprise Project Management (English/French Program, with Nantes University, France)
 Master of Business Administration in Finance (English Program, with University of Stirling, UK)
 Master of Science in finance (English Program, with University of Rennes 1, France)
 Vietnam Executive Master of Business Administration (English Program, with University of Hawai'i)

Doctoral programs 
 Doctor of World Economy and International Economic Relations
 Doctor of Business Administration

International cooperation 
Foreign Trade University provides students with an extensive range of student exchange programs with partner universities all over the world as a Non-degree international students.

References 

Educational institutions established in 1960
Universities in Hanoi
Universities in Ho Chi Minh City
1960 establishments in North Vietnam
Foreign trade of Vietnam